The 2022 Wyoming gubernatorial election took place on November 8, 2022, to elect the governor of Wyoming. Incumbent Republican Governor Mark Gordon won a second term against Democratic Wyoming State Facilities Commission member Theresa Livingston. Livingston's vote percentage was the lowest for a Democratic candidate running for governor in Wyoming since it was admitted to the union in 1890, beating Leslie Petersen's 22.90% performance in 2010. Gordon won by the widest margin in the state’s history, winning by 58.3 points and becoming the first Republican to win every county since 2010. 

Livingston's 15.82% of the vote was the weakest performance by a major party candidate in any state since that of Democrat Thomas J. Connolly in Maine in 1998. However, that election featured an independent candidate taking 59% of the vote. Livingston's performance was also the worst in a two-party race since Republican Elvin McCary's 14.8% in Alabama in 1974.

Republican primary

Candidates

Nominee
Mark Gordon, incumbent governor

Eliminated in primary
Brent Bien, civil engineer and retired U.S. Marine Corps colonel
James Scott Quick, businessman
Rex Rammell, veterinarian and perennial candidate

Declined
Bo Biteman, state senator (ran for re-election)

Endorsements

Polling

Results

Democratic primary

Candidates

Nominee
Theresa Livingston, member of the Wyoming State School Facilities Commission

Eliminated in primary
Rex Wilde, candidate for governor in 2010 and 2018 and for U.S. Senate in 2014 and 2020

Results

Libertarian convention

Candidates

Nominee
Jared Baldes

General election

Predictions

Results

See also
2022 Wyoming elections

Notes

References

External links 
Official campaign websites
Mark Gordon (R) for Governor
Theresa Livingston (D) for Governor

2022
Gubernatorial
Wyoming